Gregor Ropret (born 1 March 1989) is a Slovenian volleyball player, a member of the Slovenian national team and the Italian club Sir Safety Perugia. With Slovenia, he was the runner-up of the European Volleyball Championship three times, in 2015, 2019 and 2021.

Career
On 14 August 2015, Slovenia, including Ropret, won a gold medal in the 2015 European League. With Slovenia, he was also a runner-up of the 2015 European Championship (lost 3–0 against France in the final).

Honours

Club
National championships
 2011–12  Slovenian Championship, with ACH Volley
 2012–13  Slovenian Championship, with ACH Volley
 2013–14  Slovenian Championship, with ACH Volley

FIVB Club World Championship
  Brazil 2022 – with Sir Safety Perugia

National team
 2015  Men's European Volleyball League
 2015  Men's European Volleyball Championship
 2019  Men's European Volleyball Championship
 2021  Men's European Volleyball Championship

Individual awards

 2021: CEV European Championship – Best Setter

References

External links

 
 Player profile at LegaVolley.it  
 Player profile at Volleybox.net 

1989 births
Living people
Sportspeople from Ljubljana
Slovenian men's volleyball players
Mediterranean Games medalists in volleyball
Mediterranean Games bronze medalists for Slovenia
Competitors at the 2009 Mediterranean Games
Slovenian expatriate sportspeople in Austria
Expatriate volleyball players in Austria
Slovenian expatriate sportspeople in Italy
Expatriate volleyball players in Italy
Slovenian expatriate sportspeople in Turkey
Expatriate volleyball players in Turkey
Slovenian expatriate sportspeople in the Czech Republic
Expatriate volleyball players in the Czech Republic
Slovenian expatriate sportspeople in France
Expatriate volleyball players in France
Setters (volleyball)